Collège Ahuntsic is a French-language public college situated in the Ahuntsic-Cartierville borough of Montreal, Quebec, Canada.

History
Founded in 1967, when the Quebec system of CEGEPs was created, it is today one of the largest CÉGEPs in Quebec. The College was created out of the amalgamation of two former institutions: the College Saint-Ignace and the Institut de technologies Laval, founded respectively in 1927 and 1941. 

The College Saint-Ignace taught the humanities whereas the Institut de technologies de Laval offered the main trade programs of the era. Finally, in 1970, the adjoining school, the Institut des arts graphiques du Quebec, which was a school of printing, joined the College. Today, the College is: 3 pre-university programs; 26 technical programs; 6000 regular education/full-time students and 4000 continuous education/part-time students; 900 employees, divided between 600 faculty members and 300 management and support staff.

The name of the school comes from the district in which it is located which in turn comes from a Native hero going back to the origin of the colony.

Following the lead of McGill University (with formerly the Redmen sport teams), the name "Indiens" (Indians) and its logo have been dropped from the college's sports teams to be replaced by Les Aigles (The Eagles) in 2020.

Programs
The CEGEP offers two types of programs: pre-university and technical. The pre-university programs, which take two years to complete, cover the subject matters which roughly correspond to the additional year of high school (grade 12) and the first year of university given elsewhere in Canada. The technical programs, which take three-years to complete, applies to students who wish to pursue a skill trade.

Pre-university programs
Sciences
Health sciences
Pure and applied sciences
"Passe-partout" (a general pass program leading to all science university programs)
Social sciences
Business administration
Psychology and social interactions
Social studies
Education and culture
International studies
Arts and letters
Cinema and media studies
Literary and artistic studies
Languages, world, and culture: German
Languages, world, and culture: Spanish
Languages, world, and culture: Advanced Spanish and German

Usually, pre-university programs require four semesters (two years) to complete and lead to the obtention of a DEC.

Technical/Career programs
Health programs
Medical electrophysiology technology
Medical imaging technology
Nuclear medicine technology
Radiation oncology technology
Prehospital emergency care/paramedic
Physics programs
Laboratory technology
Biothechnologies
Analytical chemistry
Civil engineering technology
Building mechanics technology
Geomatics technology
Geodesy
Industrial engineering technology
Electronics technology
Telecommunications
Computers and networks
Industrial electronics technology
Auxiliary justice programs
Police technology
Correctional intervention technology
Paralegal technology
Administration programs
Accounting and management technology
Trade management
Medical archives
Computer science technology
Management computing
Management of computer networks
Graphic communications programs
Computer graphics
Graphic design and prepress
Printing technology
Project management in computer graphics

Usually, technical and career programs require six semesters (three years) to complete and lead to the obtention of a terminal technical degree DEC.

Particular programs

Work-study programs
Work-study programs were created for students who wish to work part-time while completing a college diploma in a particular field of study.  Although the programs usually require six semesters to complete, the time needed may be increased as a result of the part-time job.

Civil engineering technology
Geomatics technology (geodesy)
Building mechanics technology
Industrial electronics technology
Computer science technology

Technical cegep-university bridge programs
Laboratory technology (biotechnologies)
Accounting and management technology
Trade management
Computer science technology
Civil engineering technology
Computer graphics

Vocational high school-cegep bridge programs
Graphic design and prepress
Printing technology

Gallery

See also
List of colleges in Quebec
Higher education in Quebec

References

External links

Collège Ahuntsic Website  
Association étudiante
Coopérative étudiante
Syndicat du personnel enseignant du Cégep Ahuntsic (FNEEQ-CSN)

Universities and colleges in Montreal
Colleges in Quebec
Ahuntsic
Ahuntsic-Cartierville